Kristina Marie Gluesenkamp Pérez (born June 4, 1988) is an American politician and businesswoman. A member of the Democratic Party, she has been the U.S. representative for Washington's 3rd congressional district since 2023.

Early life and career

Gluesenkamp Perez was born on June 4, 1988. Her father immigrated from Mexico. She graduated from Reed College in 2012 with a degree in economics. She and her husband own an automobile repair shop in Portland, Oregon.

In 2016, Gluesenkamp Perez lost a race for Skamania County Commissioner. She received 32.79% of the vote in the August 2 primary election, finishing second behind Republican Richard Mahar. In the general election on November 8, she lost to Mahar with 46.3% of the vote. Gluesenkamp Perez has served on the Washington State Democratic Party executive committee since 2020. She has been a member of the Underwood Soil and Water District Conservation board of supervisors since 2018.

U.S. House of Representatives

Elections

2022 

Gluesenkamp Perez advanced from a nonpartisan blanket primary, which was implemented in Washington state starting in the 2008 election. In this format, all candidates of all parties are listed on the same primary ballot, and the two who get the most votes advance to the general election. In the primary, she finished first out of all candidates with 31.0% of the vote. Republican Joe Kent finished in second place and also advanced to the general election, beating the incumbent representative, Republican Jaime Herrera Beutler, by .5%. Republican Heidi St. John finished fourth, with 16.0% of the vote. The other Democrat in the race, Davy Ray, received 2.2%. In the lead-up to the primary, Democrat Brent Hennrich, who had led in two early polls by the Trafalgar Group, withdrew from the race and endorsed Gluesenkamp Perez.

The general election's rating varied from "Lean R", according to The Cook Political Report, to "Solid R" in FiveThirtyEights House of Representatives forecast. FiveThirtyEight estimated that Gluesenkamp Perez had a 2% chance of winning the general election over Kent, and was expected to receive 43.6% of the popular vote. She led in one of two polls and was trailing in the other, but both were within the margin of error. Her subsequent victory received national attention as one of the midterms' biggest upsets, and as "a microcosm of the midterms". Kent conceded on December 21, following a recount.

The Seattle Times called Gluesenkamp Perez's 2022 victory over Republican Joe Kent in the Republican-leaning district "the most stunning political upset in the country this year".

Committee assignments 

 Committee on Small Business
 Committee on Agriculture

Political positions 

In the 2016 Democratic Party presidential primaries, Gluesenkamp Perez supported Bernie Sanders. In 2022, she campaigned as a self-described moderate Democrat, a "supporter of both abortion rights and Second Amendment rights". She "emphasized support for small businesses, job training and local concerns, like the timber industry" and opposition to political extremism. Gluesenkamp Perez supports abortion rights, citing her personal experience of a miscarriage. KGW described her support for abortion rights as "a tenet of her campaign".

Gluesenkamp Perez has also said that inflation, which she blames on companies outsourcing jobs, is the top issue affecting voters in her district. She has called for both increased usage of the Strategic Petroleum Reserve in the short term and a long-term increase in the number of jobs available in green industries.

Gluesenkamp Perez believes that vote by mail is safe and has refuted unsubstantiated claims of widespread fraud among mail-in ballots. She has condemned the January 6 United States Capitol attack and criticized Kent for not doing so.

Gluesenkamp Perez opposes a ban on assault weapons, but has expressed interest in raising the age required to purchase an assault weapon to 21 from 18. She has also called for increased hiring of police to handle a surge in property crime.

In 2023, Gluesenkamp Perez voted against the Born-Alive Abortion Survivors Protection Act, which would have criminalized failing to provide care for an infant born alive after an abortion attempt.

Personal life 
Gluesenkamp Perez lives near Stevenson, Washington, in Skamania County. Married to Dean Gluesenkamp, she has one child. Gluesenkamp Perez identifies as a Protestant. In 2016, she caucused for the Bernie Sanders presidential campaign, saying that "she didn’t want to spend her whole life under Bush and Clinton presidential dynasties".

Electoral history

See also 

 List of Hispanic and Latino Americans in the United States Congress
 Women in the United States House of Representatives

References

External links

 Congresswoman Marie Gluesenkamp Perez official U.S. House website
 Marie Gluesenkamp Perez for Congress campaign website
 
 

|-

1988 births
21st-century American politicians
21st-century American women politicians
American politicians of Mexican descent
American Protestants
Christians from Texas
Christians from Washington (state)
Democratic Party members of the United States House of Representatives from Washington (state)
Female members of the United States House of Representatives
Hispanic and Latino American members of the United States Congress
Hispanic and Latino American women in politics
Living people
People from Harris County, Texas
People from Skamania County, Washington
Protestants from Washington (state)
Reed College alumni
Women in Washington (state) politics